Quik the Thunder Rabbit is a side-scrolling platform video game, which Stywox developed for Titus France to publish on the Amiga and Amiga CD32 in 1994. A port for the Super NES was planned but cancelled.

References

1994 video games
Amiga CD32 games
Amiga games
Platform games
Titus Software games
Side-scrolling video games
Video games about rabbits and hares
Video games developed in France